Eytan Mirsky (born December 18, 1961) is a New York City-based American singer-songwriter.

Career 
He is known mainly for his original contributions to film soundtracks, including the title songs for the critically acclaimed films Happiness (sung by R.E.M.'s Michael Stipe) and American Splendor (in which he himself appeared singing the theme). He also contributed three songs to the film The Tao of Steve, including the title song and “(I Just Wanna Be) Your Steve McQueen.” He also contributed music to the films Palindromes, The Company and Desert Blue.

Mirsky’s 1996 debut album, Songs About Girls (& Other Painful Subjects), garnered praise from critics, as did six subsequent albums. Mirsky also contributed a cover of George Harrison's "Don't Bother Me" to a 2002 tribute album, He Was Fab, as well as a cover of Rupert Holmes' "Escape (The Piña Colada Song)" to 2013's Drink a Toast to Innocence: A Tribute to Lite Rock. Among the musicians who have played on Mirsky's recordings are Jon Gordon, best known for his guitar work for Suzanne Vega, and Larry Saltzman, guitarist on a number of Simon & Garfunkel tours.

Formerly a student of New York University’s Graduate Institute of Film and Television, Mirsky worked as an assistant sound editor on the films What's Eating Gilbert Grape, Carlito's Way and The Bonfire of the Vanities, and as a sound effects editor on the films Chicago and A Beautiful Mind, both of which won Academy Awards for Best Picture. Mirsky also appeared as a contestant on Jeopardy! in January 1988, finishing in second place.

Discography

 Songs About Girls (& Other Painful Subjects) (Mirsky Mouse Records, 1996)
 Get Ready for Eytan! (M-Squared Records, 1999)
 Was It Something I Said? (M-Squared Records, 2001) — features "(I Just Wanna Be) Your Steve McQueen" from The Tao of Steve
 Everyone's Having Fun Tonight! (M-Squared Records, 2004) — features "Happiness" and "American Splendor"
 Year of the Mouse (M-Squared Records, 2012)
 Funny Money (Mirsky Mouse Records, 2016)
 If Not Now...Later (Mirsky Mouse Records, 2019)

References

External links
 Eytan Mirsky at BandCamp
 
 [ Eytan Mirsky on Allmusic.com]
 Eytan Mirsky interview with Michael McCartney on The Time Machine
 Eytan Mirsky interview on Films42 website
 Review of "Funny Money" - Rockerzine.com 2016

Living people
20th-century American Jews
Jeopardy! contestants
Singers from New York City
1961 births
21st-century American Jews
Singer-songwriters from New York (state)